Andrew Holger Olsen (November 30, 1930 - May 23, 2014) was a former professional baseball umpire who worked in the National League from 1968 to 1980, wearing uniform number 12 for most of his career. Olsen umpired 1,860 major league games in his 13-year career. He umpired in the 1974 World Series, three League Championship Series (1971, 1975, and 1978) and the 1976 Major League Baseball All-Star Game.

He was born in Brooklyn, New York.

See also 

 List of Major League Baseball umpires

References

External links
The Sporting News umpire card

1931 births
2014 deaths
Major League Baseball umpires
Minor league baseball players
Sportspeople from New York (state)